Malda Baumgartė (born 7 January 1965) is a Latvian-born Lithuanian retired Paralympic athlete who competed at international track and field competitions, she competed in discus throw, javelin throw, shot put and formerly pentathlon. She is a double Paralympic champion and a World champion in her disciplines. She is also a former sitting volleyball player.

Stabbing
On Christmas Eve, Baumgartė went to walk home after finishing her work shift late at night. She decided to take a shortcut rather than taking her normal route back to her house, a man jumped out of some bushes nearby and stabbed Baumgartė in her back twice. She was spotted lying on the snow in her blood by a passerby hours later. Doctors managed to reconnect the nerves in her spine and was hoped that she would be able to walk again; she required the use of a wheelchair for three to four months. The man who stabbed Baumgartė was sentenced to eight years in jail. She decided to move to Lithuania and gained Lithuanian citizenship in a short space of time.

References

1965 births
Living people
People from Ventspils
Sportspeople from Klaipėda
Paralympic athletes of Lithuania
Lithuanian female discus throwers
Lithuanian female javelin throwers
Lithuanian female shot putters
Athletes (track and field) at the 1992 Summer Paralympics
Athletes (track and field) at the 1996 Summer Paralympics
Athletes (track and field) at the 2000 Summer Paralympics
Athletes (track and field) at the 2004 Summer Paralympics
Athletes (track and field) at the 2008 Summer Paralympics
Volleyball players at the 2008 Summer Paralympics
Stabbing survivors
Paralympic discus throwers
Paralympic javelin throwers
Paralympic shot putters